Vallecito Valley is a valley in San Diego County, California. Vallecito, its original name, is a Spanish word meaning "little valley".

References

Valleys of San Diego County, California
East County (San Diego County)